Lothrop may refer to:

People

Surname
Amy Lothrop, pseudonym of Anna Bartlett Warner (1827–1915), American writer of books and religious poems
Corrie Lothrop (born 1992), American artistic gymnast
Daniel Lothrop (1831–1892), American publisher
Forest Lothrop (born 1924), former American football coach in the United States
George V. N. Lothrop (1817–1897), politician in the U.S. state of Michigan and Michigan Attorney General from 1848 until 1851
John Lothrop (1584–1653), English Anglican clergyman, became a Congregationalist minister and emigrant to New England
Samuel Kirkland Lothrop (1892–1965), American archaeologist and anthropologist
Samuel Kirkland Lothrop (clergyman) (1804–1886), American Unitarian clergyman

Given name
Frederick Lothrop Ames, Jr. (1876–1921), the great-grandson of Oliver Ames, who established the Ames Shovel Company
Harold Lothrop Borden, (1876–1900), the only son of Canada's Minister of Militia and Defence, Frederick William Borden
John Lothrop Brown (1815–1887), farmer, merchant and political figure in Nova Scotia, Canada
Orville Lothrop Freeman (1918–2003), American Democratic politician, 29th Governor of Minnesota
John Lothrop Motley (died 1877), American historian and diplomat
Lothrop Stoddard (1883–1950), American historian, journalist, racial anthropologist, eugenicist and political theorist
Lothrop Withington (1856–1915), American genealogist, historian, and book editor, killed in the sinking of the RMS Lusitania

Places
Lothrop, Alberta, municipal district in northwestern Alberta, Canada
Lothrop, Montana, unincorporated community
New Lothrop, Michigan, village in Hazelton Township, Shiawassee County in the U.S. state of Michigan

Other
Caleb Lothrop House, historic house at 14 Summer Street in Cohasset, Massachusetts
H.B. Lothrop Store, historic store at 210 Weir Street in Taunton, Massachusetts
Joseph Lothrop House, historic house at 208 Turnpike Road in Westborough, Massachusetts
Lothrop Hall, a major student dormitory at the University of Pittsburgh in Pennsylvania
Lothrop Mansion, historic home in Washington, D.C., in the Kalorama neighborhood
Lothrop Memorial Building-G.A.R. Hall, historic Grand Army of the Republic hall at Washington and Governor Streets in Taunton, Massachusetts
Lothrop School, public elementary school located at 3300 North 22nd Street in the Kountze Place neighborhood of North Omaha, Nebraska

See also
Woodward & Lothrop, department store chain headquartered in Washington, D.C.